Takehiko Kanagoki (17 June 1914 – 19 February 1992) was a Japanese basketball player. He competed in the men's tournament at the 1936 Summer Olympics. His correct family name is Kanokogi (鹿子木), not Kanagoki. He was the son of Japanese father, Kanokogi Kazunobu, philosopher, and Polish-German mother, Cornelia, Tadeusz Stefan Zieliński's daughter.

References

External links
 

1914 births
1992 deaths
Japanese men's basketball players
Japanese people of German descent
Japanese people of Polish descent
Olympic basketball players of Japan
Basketball players at the 1936 Summer Olympics
Basketball players from Tokyo